The Hoesch reaction or Houben–Hoesch reaction is an organic reaction in which a nitrile reacts with an arene compound to form an aryl ketone. The reaction is a type of Friedel-Crafts acylation with hydrogen chloride and a Lewis acid catalyst.

The synthesis of 2,4,6-Trihydroxyacetophenone (THAP) from phloroglucinol is representative: If two-equivalents are added, 2,4-Diacetylphloroglucinol is the product.

An imine can be isolated as an intermediate reaction product. The attacking electrophile is possibly a species of the type R-C+=NHCl−. The arene must be electron-rich i.e. phenol or aniline type.  A related reaction is the Gattermann reaction in which hydrocyanic acid not a nitrile is used.

The reaction is named after Kurt Hoesch and Josef Houben who reported about this new reaction type in respectively 1915 and 1926.

Mechanism
The mechanism of the reaction involves two steps. The first step is a nucleophilic addition to the nitrile with the aid of a polarizing Lewis acid, forming an imine, which is later hydrolyzed during the aqueous workup to yield the final aryl ketone.

See also
 Stephen aldehyde synthesis
 Gattermann reaction
Hoesch reaction is demonstrated for Buflomedil.

References

Substitution reactions
Name reactions